Ko Chun-hsiung (15 January 1945 – 6 December 2015) was a Taiwanese actor, director and politician. He had been acting since the 1960s and had appeared in more than 200 films.

His career accolades included three Golden Horse Awards, two Asia Pacific Film Festival Awards for Best Actor, a Panama International Film Festival Award for Best Actor. In 2005, Chinese Film Association of Performance Art named Ko on the list of 100 Outstanding Artists in Chinese Film (1905 - 2004).

Life

Early life
Ko was born in Kaohsiung. During Taiwan under Japanese rule, he attended Kaohsiung No.2 School and graduated from National Taiwan University of Arts, he also studied at Tokyo University and Saint John's College.

Acting career
Ko began his career by appearing in small roles before 1965. He appeared in The Silent Wife later that year. In 1967, Ko starred as Feng Ze in Ching-Zue Bai's Lonely Seventeen, for which he won his first Best Actor Award at the Asia Pacific Film Festival. In 1974, Ko starred as Zhang Zizhong in the historical film The Everlasting Glory, which earned Ko his second Best Actor Award at the Asia Pacific Film Festival. In 1976, Ko acted in the historical film Eight Hundred Heroes directed by Ting Shan-hsi, playing the role of Xie Jinyuan, he won a Golden Horse Award.

Ko won the Best Actor Award at the 1979 Golden Horse Awards for his performance in A Teacher of Great Soldiers.

In 1981, Ko self-directed and performed in My Grandfather, which earned him a Best Actor Award at the Panama International Film Festival. In 1989, Ko starred as Duan Yihu, reuniting him with co-star Jackie Chan, who played Guo Zhenhua, in the romantic comedy film Miracles, which were highly praised by audience. In 1999, Ko filmed in Cao Cao, he received the Best Actor Award at the 36th Golden Horse Awards. In 2012, Ko participated in the Taiwanese-language television drama Feng Shui Family.

Political career
Ko became involved in politics in 1990.

In 1996, Ko stood unsuccessfully in the Provisional Legislative Council Election in British Hong Kong.

Ko defeated incumbent legislator Chang Tsai Mei in a July 2004 Kuomintang party primary, and represented Hsinchu City Constituency in the Legislative Yuan from 1 February 2005 to 31 January 2008.

In 2007, Ko joined the Taiwan Farmers' Party, but was not reelected in the 2008 legislative elections.

Personal life
Ko was twice married. Originally wed to actress Chang Mei-yao in 1970, he became the father of two children, Ko Yishan and Ko Pinyin. They divorced in 2004, as Ko was involved in an affair with Tsai Qinghua, who Ko married the next year. Ko's second marriage also produced two children, Ko Jianyu and Ko Zier. Chang, Ko's first wife, died in 2012.

Death
Ko died on 6 December 2015 at Tri-Service General Hospital in Taipei, a year after being diagnosed with lung cancer.  He was 70.

Works

Film

Television

Awards

References

External links
 
 
 

1945 births
2015 deaths
Deaths from lung cancer
Kaohsiung Members of the Legislative Yuan
Taiwanese male film actors
Taiwanese male television actors
Members of the 6th Legislative Yuan
Kuomintang Members of the Legislative Yuan in Taiwan
20th-century Taiwanese male actors
21st-century Taiwanese male actors
Taiwanese actor-politicians
Taiwanese people of Hoklo descent
Deaths from cancer in Taiwan
National Taiwan University of Arts alumni
Male actors from Kaohsiung